Martin Fabinyi is an Australian film and television producer and director, songwriter and music label owner and has written books on the local rock music scene. He was the chief executive officer of Mushroom Pictures from its formation in 1993 to 2009. His film projects include the features Chopper (2000), Gettin' Square (2003), Wolf Creek (2005) and Macbeth (2006). Fabinyi was profiled  by Variety and named one of the most influential people in the Australian film industry by Screen International magazine.

In 1978 Fabinyi and composer Cameron Allan formed the label Regular Records, initially for releases by pop and R&B band, Mental As Anything.

Early life 

Martin Fabinyi was born and grew up in Melbourne. He was one of five children of the Hungarian-born book publisher Andrew Fabinyi (1908–1978), and Elisabeth Clare (nee Robinson, 1912–2002), an administrative officer and librarian. Dr. Fabinyi OBE, as Managing Director of F.W. Cheshire, became one of Australia's most influential and celebrated publishers, including publishing Joan Lindsay's Picnic At Hanging Rock, Alan Marshall's I Can Jump Puddles and early work by David Malouf and Robin Boyd. Fabinyi was educated at [[Wesley College, Melbourne]. He worked as a film editor and appeared as Cousin Martin on the children's Tarax Show with "Uncle" Norman Swain  on the Nine Network and then spent two years studying drama at Flinders University in Adelaide from 1969 where he founded and edited the student newspaper Empire Times.

Career 

In 1973 he moved to Sydney and joined the Filmmakers Co-op. Fabinyi, who had shot independent works in Adelaide, received a grant from the Experimental Film Board to make The Vacuum (1975), one of the first projects in Australia to be shot on portable videotape. A satire on the personalities behind religious cults, featuring a game show guest starring Johnny O'Keefe and starring Stephen MacLean, Charlie Dare and drag act Sylvia and the Synthetics, the video premiered at the Co-op, and toured universities with a live performance from the Synthetics and Fabinyi's earlier work, including the controversial TV Dinner (1973). Fabinyi, who was influenced by German artist Otto Muehl, continued to work in video and was a founding member of Bush Video, the group which wired up and broadcast on-site during the 1973 Aquarius Festival in Nimbin. In 1974 Fabinyi received a grant to screen a selection of Australian experimental films in London. Writing for Filmnews he reported on the series of events held in April to May 1975.

He continued working with the group Sylvia and the Synthetics in performance art and was invited to participate in the Adelaide Fringe Festival in 1975. His piece, which involved nudity and video (the audience only seeing the video and therefore not sure whether the event was live or not) was staged in a tent next to the Torrens River and attracted the attention of the local police who claimed they could see behind the screens and charged Fabinyi with "Aiding and abetting an indecent act". Whilst the Adelaide Festival organisers debated whether to show the video across the city (that year monitors screened events on most city street corners), Fabinyi was in court. Eventually, after an appeal was lost, he was sentenced to three months hard labour. This was reported in Sydney by Richard Neville in the Nation Review as an outrage, prompting still more debate.

Fabinyi returned to Sydney and the world of rock and roll, teaming with photographer Philip Morris for the book, The Bumper Book of Rock. With Morris he designed record covers, photo shoots and documented the 1970s Sydney scene with Morris and rock legend Johnny O'Keefe. Fabinyi began writing feature film scripts with co-writers and directors including Cameron Allan (1955–2013).

Regular Records 

Fabinyi and Allan also shared a passion for pop music escpecially Sydney-based band Mental As Anything, which became the first signing for their new label, Regular Records, formed in September 1978. The band's talent manager was soon replaced by his brother, Jeremy Fabinyi. Distributed by Festival Records, Regular Records nevertheless remained as an independent label for fifteen years, breaking artists such as Icehouse, I'm Talking and Kate Ceberano. The label's artists cumulatively sold over five million albums. It released "Australiana" (1983), which became a number-one hit for comedian, Austen Tayshus. Regular Records also signed the Reels, Stephen Cummings, the Cockroaches (later became the Wiggles) and Electric Pandas. Allan left Australia (and the label) in mid-1980s to work in the United States; Fabinyi sold the label in 1995.

In 1990 Fabinyi was appointed editor of Follow Me Gentlemen, a men's fashion magazine version of Follow Me. Changing its name to FMG, it was a precursor to Australian men's fashion and general magazines. In 1999 Fabinyi and Toby Creswell co-authored The Real Thing: Adventures in Australian Rock & Roll, 1957-now, a history of Australian rock and roll between 1957 and the late 1990s.<ref>Stuart Coupe, "This Is the Real Thing" (book review), 'The Sydney Morning Herald, 18 September 1999, p. 170.</ref>

 Mushroom Pictures 

Fabinyi formed Mushroom Pictures with Michael Gudinski of Mushroom Records in 1993 as the film-making branch of [the [Mushroom Group]].Richard Guilliatt, "Between rock and a hard place", The Sydney Morning Herald, 11 October 1997, p. 293. Mushroom Pictures began by making documentaries for the ABC, Discovery Channel and the Nine Network. Early works were Tribal Voice – Yothu Yindi (1993 TV documentary on Indigenous rock group Yothu Yindi), Kate Ceberano & Friends (1993 TV series), Next to Nothing and Nothing to Hide (on lingerie and swimwear) and The Singer and the Swinger (1998 TV documentary on Johnny O'Keefe and Lee Gordon).

In 2000 Mushroom Pictures produced and released the horror feature spoof Cut starring Molly Ringwald and Kylie Minogue, which was sold worldwide and achieved box office success in Europe and Asia. Mushroom Pictures' second feature, Chopper, which Fabinyi executive produced, was the first Australian R+18 rated feature to go No. 1, grossing over $5 million. It became a worldwide cult phenomena and launched the careers of both director Andrew Dominik and actor Eric Bana. Mushroom Pictures moved into local distribution with Russian Doll. In 2003, Fabinyi produced Gettin' Square, directed by Jonathan Teplitzky and starring David Wenham and Sam Worthington, which garnered box office success and critical acclaim. This was followed by Geoffrey Wright's take on Macbeth, also starring Sam Worthington. Mushroom Pictures moved back to television with Great Australian Albums seasons 1 (2007) and 2 (2008), an eight-part documentary series on influential Australian bands' albums for SBS Television. Its first season was described by Graeme Blundell in The Australian as the best documentary series of the year. Mushroom Pictures distributed the American documentary Anvil! The Story of Anvil, the feature film Cedar Boys, and Mad Bastards in 2010. Fabinyi had worked as CEO from 1994 to 2009.

 Beyond Entertainment 

In 2010 Fabinyi joined Beyond Entertainment as Head of Documentaries and Feature Films. Manny Lewis, a feature film starring Carl Barron, was released in 2015 in conjunction with Studio Canal. The origins of AC/DC were a part of a documentary on the record label Albert Productions, Blood + Thunder (2015), written and directed by Paul Clarke. This two-part documentary mini-series was screened on ABC-TV and BBC4. 

Fabinyi and Beyond CEO Mikael Borglund executive produced the 12-part ABC-TV music documentary series Days Like These with Diesel (2022). Fabinyi has produced The Hardest Line a feature-length documentary on Midnight Oil in conjunction with Blink TV to be released through Roadshow Films in 2023. He also co-produced feature documentary The Angels: Kickin' Down the Door, released through Universal Pictures in 2022 and is executive producing John Farnham: Finding the Voice to be released in 2023 by Sony Pictures. In development are scripted features and documentaries with emerging filmmakers.

 Personal life 
Fabinyi was married to fashion designer Jenny-Jane Carpenter from 1988 to 1993.

Bibliography
Books

Martin Fabinyi, The Real Thing: Adventures in Australian Rock & Roll, 1957-Now (abstract), Random House Australia, 2000 via Google Books. Retrieved 9 November 2022.
Articles
 Fabinyi, Martin (2013). "Composer was a restless intellect", The Sydney Morning Herald, 19 July 2013 - obituary of Cameron Allan.
 Fabinyi, Martin (2022). Elvis: a Baz Luhrmann extravaganza (film review), sydneysentinel.com.au, 30 June 2022.
 Fabinyi, Martin (2022). "Margrete: Queen of the North – Review", cityhubsydney.com.au, 8 November 2022.

 Filmography 

Credits:
 TV Dinner (1973) – video: filmmaker 
 The Vacuum (1975) – video feature: director, writer, producer
 The Crossing (1990) – feature film: music co-ordinator
 Tribal Voice – Yothu Yindi (1993) – TV documentary: producer
 Fashion (1993) – TV series: executive producer
 Kate Ceberano & Friends (1993) – TV series: executive producer
 Next to Nothing/Nothing to Hide (1995) – TV series: executive producer
 Counting the Beat (1996) – TV documentary: executive producer
 The Singer and the Swinger (1999) – documentary: executive producer
 Cut (2000) – feature film: producer
 Chopper (2000) – feature film: executive producer
 Horseplay (2003) – feature film: executive producer
 Gettin' Square (2003) – feature film: producer
 Wolf Creek (2005) – feature film: executive producer
 Macbeth (2006) – producer
 Storm Warning (2007) – feature film: executive producer
 Great Australian Albums (2007, 2008) – TV series: executive producer
 Cannot Buy My Soul (2008) – feature documentary: executive producer
 Cedar Boys (2009) – feature film: executive producer
 Bait 3D (2011) – feature film: co-executive producer
 Manny Lewis (2015) – feature film: producer
 Blood + Thunder: The Story of Alberts (2015) – TV documentary mini-series 
 Indigo Lake (2016) – feature film: executive producer
 Backburning (2018) – short documentary: producer
 Days Like These (2022) – TV series: executive producer 

 The Angels: Kickin' Down the Door (2022) – producer
 The Hardest Line (2023) – feature documentary: producer 
 John Farnham – Finding the Voice'' (2023) – feature documentary: executive producer

Awards and nominations 

 2003: AACTA Awards (previously known as IF Awards) – 'Best Film' - Gettin' Square – nominee

 2015: 15th Screen Producers Australia Awards - Documentary Television Production - Blood and Thunder - nominee

References

External links
 Martin Fabinyi at Screen Australia's The Screen Guide.
 Biographical cuttings on Martin Fabinyi, former photographic designer for record covers at National Library of Australia
 Martin Fabinyi at British Film Institute

Australian magazine editors
Film directors from Melbourne
Australian screenwriters
Living people
Year of birth missing (living people)
Australian people of Hungarian descent
20th-century Australian male writers